ATP Flight School, headquartered in Jacksonville, Florida, is the largest flight training company in the United States. The privately held company was founded in 1984 in Atlanta, GA by its current management, a small group of airline pilots. ATP’s initial focus was providing flight training to U.S. military pilots who were seeking their Airline Transport Pilot Certificates to transition over to commercial air carrier operations. Maintaining a focus on professional flight training, ATP later expanded its course offerings to include ab-initio training programs for domestic students seeking a career in commercial aviation. Today, ATP is the leading supplier of professionally trained pilots to the nation's regional airlines.

Schools
ATP Flight School has 77 (as of January 13, 2023) locations throughout the United States, opening several in the last year. In Dallas, TX, ATP operates a part 142 airline training center called ATP JETS, that provides Airline Transport Pilot Certification Training Program (ATP CTP) training for ten airlines. In November, 2021, ATP JETS graduated its 10,000th ATP CTP student.

Training
ATP Flight School solely focuses on airline-oriented flight training, operating their programs with a fixed-cost, fixed timeframe training model. ATP's primary product offering is an ab-initio airline pilot training program, which provides pilot certification from zero experience through commercial multi-engine pilot, with certificated flight instructor certificates. Most graduates of this program may then become flight instructors with the school to gain experience and build flight time to meet airline hiring minimums.

Other programs offered by ATP include type ratings and the Airline Transport Pilot Certification Training Program (ATP CTP). These programs are only offered at the school's ATP JETS location in Dallas, TX, with all others being dedicated to flight operations. Over 1% of all general aviation flight operations in the United States is conducted by ATP, who flies over 38,700 hours per month resulting in students' earning 8,344 certificates annually (as of March, 2022).

ATP is partnered with Arizona State University, and is the flight provider for its Professional Flight bachelor's degree program, based out of the Phoenix-Mesa Gateway Airport facility. Aircraft used for the contract are painted in a special livery featuring the ASU logo and pitchfork.

Fleet
ATP Flight School has the largest multi-engine training fleet in the world, consisting exclusively of Piper Seminoles, with the exception of one Cessna CE-525 CitationJet. A mix of Piper Archers and Cessna CE-172 Skyhawks make up their single-engine fleet, the majority going to the latter.

Piper Aircraft Inc. and ATP jointly made an announcement at the 2011 National Business Aviation Association (NBAA) Annual Meeting and Convention for the sale of 30 new Piper Seminoles – a total retail value of $18 million. All of the new airplanes under the agreement are to be equipped with Garmin’s G500 glass cockpit avionics suite (bringing the total number of aircraft with the Garmin glass flight decks to 270).

In April, 2013, ATP and Piper Aircraft reached an agreement for the purchase of up to 100 Piper Archers. Initial deliveries began in late 2013, and under the agreement, all aircraft are standardized with the Garmin G500 avionics suite. A second order for an additional 100 Piper Archers was announced at the 2018 Sun 'n Fun International Fly-In and Expo and on September 19, 2018, ATP accepted delivery of its 100th Archer under the first order.

ATP Flight School boasts 134 Flight Training Devices (FTDs). These include the Frasca Piper Seminole Truflite FTDs with GNS 430, AATD, Redbird, CRJ-200, and Full Flight Simulators that are full motion, Level D simulators.

As of March 2022, ATP Flight School maintained a fleet of 463 aircraft distributed among 71 locations, consisting of the following:
 180 Cessna CE-172 Skyhawks
 191 Piper Archer TXs
 92 Piper PA-44 Seminoles

Airline relationships
ATP Flight School has hiring relationships with 36 U.S. based regional airlines, major airlines, and corporate operators, including SkyWest Airlines, Endeavor Air, Mesa Airlines, and PSA Airlines. These relationships and alliances are based on letters of understanding, or letters of agreement. While these letters vary between air carriers, in general they bestow either reduced hiring minimums for graduates of ATP or airline tuition reimbursement. ATP has partnerships with United Airlines, participating in the United Aviate program, as well as Delta Air Lines through the Delta Propel program.

In 2018, ATP and Envoy Air, a wholly owned subsidiary of American Airlines Group, established a partnership through the Envoy Cadet Program. Under the program, flight instructors at the school are provided a path to a pilot career with American Airlines, as well as financial assistance and health benefits.

In partnership with Frontier Airlines, ATP launched the Frontier Direct Program in January, 2021. Under the agreement, ATP graduates and flight instructors can progress straight from ATP to a first officer position with Frontier after attending an enhanced ATP CTP, which includes additional Airbus A320 full-motion flight simulator time. Spirit, Avelo, and Sun Country followed with similar partnerships, allowing ATP graduates to become First Officers with the airlines at 1,500 hours of flight time.

As of March, 2022, the flight school reported having 1,210 airline placements in the past 12 months, which is the highest ratio of airline placements to students of any flight school, aviation college, or flight academy.

Accidents and incidents
On December 6, 2008, a twin-engine Piper PA-44 owned by ATP Flight School experienced a mid-air collision in the Everglades. The plane was flown by an ATP instructor and student pilot. The other plane involved was a Cessna 172R owned by Pelican Flight Training, also with two passengers, an instructor and student. There were no survivors.

On July 28, 2011 a single engine Cessna 172 with a student pilot and instructor were on a cross-county training flight. The aircraft experienced a partial engine failure after takeoff. After failing to land on an intended runway the instructor chose to ditch the aircraft into Lake Okeechobee to avoid other obstacles. Both pilots survived with one experiencing minor injuries. 

On March 24, 2014, a twin-engine Piper PA-44 owned by ATP Flight School crashed near Brunswick Georgia crashed after a suspected break-up of the airframe in IFR conditions. Post-crash inspection of the instrumentation suggests the aircraft's only functional vacuum pump failed during flight in IFR conditions causing potential spatial disorientation. The NTSB probable cause of the accident was "An inflight failure of the airplane's only operating vacuum pump, which resulted in the loss of attitude information provided by vacuum-driven flight instruments. Also causal was the pilots' failure to maintain control of the airplane while operating in instrument flight rules (IFR) conditions, likely due to spatial disorientation, following the failure of the vacuum pump. Contributing to the accident was the operator's decision to dispatch the airplane with a known inoperative vacuum pump into IFR conditions." Both pilots suffered fatal injuries in the accident

On June 9, 2018, a twin-engine Piper PA-44 was on an approach to landing when it experienced a microburst and hit the tops of two homes then crashed into a retention pond in Daytona Beach, Florida. The plane was flown by an ATP instructor and student pilot. Both pilots experienced minor injuries.

On May 29, 2021, a Cessna 172 on an introductory flight crashed near Powder Mountain Ski Resort in Ogden, Utah. The student perished and the instructor died shortly after at a nearby hospital.

References

External links 
 Official Site

Organizations based in Jacksonville, Florida
Privately held companies based in Florida
Educational institutions established in 1984
Aviation schools in the United States
Aviation schools in Florida
1984 establishments in Florida